Center Township is one of nine townships in Hancock County, Indiana, United States. As of the 2010 census, its population was 25,819 and it contained 10,909 housing units.

History
Center Township was organized in 1831. It was named from its position at the geographical center of Hancock County.

Geography
Lakes in this township include Roberts Lake. The stream of Little Brandywine Creek runs through this township.

Cities and towns
 Greenfield (vast majority)

Unincorporated towns
 Bowman Acres
 Cooper Corner
 Maxwell
 Riley
 Sugar Hills
(This list is based on USGS data and may include former settlements.)

Adjacent townships
 Green Township (north)
 Jackson Township (east)
 Blue River Township (southeast)
 Brandywine Township (south)
 Sugar Creek Township (southwest)
 Buck Creek Township (west)
 Vernon Township (northwest)

Cemeteries
The township contains eleven cemeteries: Alford, Barrett, Caldwell, Cooper, Hinchman, Mount Carmel, Park, Pratt, Reeves, Sugar Creek and Willet.

Major highways
  Interstate 70
  U.S. Route 40
  State Road 9

Airports and landing strips
 Pope Field

References
 
 United States Census Bureau cartographic boundary files

External links
 Indiana Township Association
 United Township Association of Indiana

Townships in Hancock County, Indiana
Townships in Indiana
Populated places established in 1831
1831 establishments in Indiana